XHPVJ-FM 94.3/XEPVJ-AM 1110 is a combo radio station in Puerto Vallarta, Jalisco, Mexico, with FM transmitter at Bahía de Banderas, Nayarit. It is owned by Radiorama and carries a grupera format known as La Poderosa.

History

XEPVJ received its first concession on February 24, 1993. It added its FM station the next year.

References

Spanish-language radio stations
Radio stations in Jalisco
Radio stations established in 1993